Elipsocus obscurus is a species of damp barklouse in the family Elipsocidae. It is found in Central America and North America.

References

Elipsocidae
Articles created by Qbugbot
Insects described in 1980